Priscila Navarro (born 27 April 1994, in Huánuco) is a Peruvian pianist. At age 5 she began practicing her first notes on a keyboard she had received as a Christmas gift. As she learned quickly her father continued to support her talent and she was enrolled in a summer course of piano at the National Cultural Institute in Trujillo, Peru, with Professor Silvia Rosales Tam.

As of 2014, Navarro is enrolled at the Bower School of Music at Florida Gulf Coast University.

Awards
2007: First place National Concerto Competition in Lima, Peru 
2009: Maddy Summer Artist Award
Kiwanis Music Festival special scholarship
2011: Music Teachers National Association Piano Competitions, solo and duet
2013: First place Biennial International Beethoven Sonata Competition

References

Florida Gulf Coast University press release
Ministry Of External Affairs Of Peru - Cultural Centre Inca Garcilaso

1994 births
Living people
Peruvian pianists
21st-century pianists